Stelfox is a surname. Notable people with the surname include:

Arthur Wilson Stelfox (1883–1972), Irish naturalist and architect
Dawson Stelfox (born 1958), Northern Irish architect
James Stelfox (born 1976), English musician
Margarita Dawson Stelfox (1886–1971), Irish botanist
Shirley Stelfox (1941–2015), English actress